Schiffers is a surname. Notable people with the surname include:

 Andrzej Boleslaw Schiffers, Polish businessman
 Emanuel Schiffers (1850–1904), Russian chess player and chess writer
 Marie-Hélène Schiffers, Belgian racing cyclist

See also
 Schiffer